Chappel is an unincorporated community in San Saba County, in the U.S. state of Texas. According to the Handbook of Texas, the community had a population of 25 in 2015.

History
David and Esther Matsler settled along Cherokee Creek near the area where Chappel would eventually be founded on October 7, 1854. The Rumsey and Poplin families, the Low brothers, Ambrose Casey, and E.M. Boyett followed suit. Other settlers raised livestock and participated in irrigation and chairmaking in the 1860s. Two decades later, Joab B. Harrell donated  of land for a local Methodist Episcopal Church. A post office known as Keeney was established here in 1879 on the banks of Davis Creek. The postmaster was George Keeney, who operated it in his home until a flood demolished the building that next year. Sabina A. Self established another post office in 1891 and called it Richards. It suffered the same fate as the Keeney post office. A third post office was established at Chappel in 1897 and remained in operation until 1917. It reopened that next year and remained in operation until 1941. It was named Chappel for a local church. Mail was sent from San Saba until 1891, then from Bend until 1897. In 1914, the settlement had 25 residents and two general stores. The population grew to 69 in 1925 then went down to 50 from 1939 through 1964. The businesses declined from 10 in 1933 to only two in 1939. Only one business remained in 1945. It closed in 1964 and only a church and cemetery remained in Chappel in 1984. It lost half of its population from 1966 through 2015.

Geography

Climate
The climate in this area is characterized by hot, humid summers and generally mild to cool winters. According to the Köppen Climate Classification system, Chappel has a humid subtropical climate, abbreviated "Cfa" on climate maps.

Education
The church building served as a school until a separate building was erected in 1892. Today the community is served by the San Saba Independent School District.

References

Unincorporated communities in San Saba County, Texas
Unincorporated communities in Texas